Dijon-Ville station, sometimes simply Dijon, is a railway station located in Dijon, Côte-d'Or, eastern France. The station was opened in 1849. It is located at the junction of Paris–Marseille, and Dijon-Vallorbe lines. The train services are operated by SNCF and Lyria.

Train services
From Dijon train services depart to major French cities such as: Paris, Lyon, Marseille, Nice, Montpellier,  Belfort, Besançon, Mulhouse, Strasbourg.

International services operate to Switzerland: Zürich, Basel, Lausanne and Luxembourg.

High speed services (TGV) Paris - Dijon - Besançon - Belfort - Mulhouse
High speed services (TGV) Paris - Dijon - Besançon-Viotte
High speed services (TGV) Paris - Dijon - Lausanne
High speed services (TGV) Paris - Dijon - Mulhouse - Basel - Zürich
High speed services (TGV) Paris - Dijon - Chalon-sur-Saône
High speed services (TGV) Luxembourg - Strasbourg - Besançon - Dijon - Lyon - Montpellier /Marseille
High speed services (TGV) Nancy - Strasbourg - Dijon - Lyon - Avignon - Marseille - Cannes - Nice
High speed services (TGV) Metz - Strasbourg - Besançon - Dijon - Lyon - Valence TGV - Montpellier
Intercity services (Ouigo) Paris - Dijon - Lyon
Regional services (TER Bourgogne-Franche-Comté) Dijon - Beaune - Montchanin - Le Creusot - Étang - NeversRegional services (TER Bourgogne-Franche-Comté) Dijon - Beaune - Chagny - Chalon-sur-SaôneRegional services (TER Bourgogne-Franche-Comté) Dijon - Dole - BesançonRegional services (TER Bourgogne-Franche-Comté) Dijon - Montbard - Laroche-Migennes - AuxerreRegional services (TER Bourgogne-Franche-Comté) Dijon - Beaune - Chagny - Chalon-sur-Saône - Macon - LyonRegional services (TER Bourgogne-Franche-Comté) Dijon - St-Jean-de-Losne - Seurre - Louhans - Bourg-en-BresseRegional services (TER Bourgogne-Franche-Comté) Dijon - Is-sur-TilleRegional services (TER Bourgogne-Franche-Comté) Paris - Sens - Laroche-Migennes - Dijon''

References

External links 
 
 

Railway stations in France opened in 1849
Railway stations in Côte-d'Or